Frederic J. Brown may refer to:

Frederic J. Brown II (1905–1971), U.S. Army lieutenant general and father of Frederic J. Smith III
Frederic J. Brown III (born 1934), U.S. Army lieutenant general and son of Frederic J. Smith II